John "Jumpin' Johnny" Baum (born June 17, 1946) is a retired American basketball player. Born in Philadelphia, he played collegiately for Temple University.

A  and 200 lb (91 kg) forward, he was selected by the Los Angeles Lakers in the 15th round (187th pick overall) of the 1968 NBA draft and by the Chicago Bulls in the second round (23rd pick overall) of the 1969 NBA draft.

He played for the Chicago Bulls (1969–71) in the NBA and for the New York Nets (1971–73), Memphis Tams and Indiana Pacers (1973–74) in the American Basketball Association (ABA) for 244 games.

References

External links

1946 births
Living people
Allentown Jets players
American men's basketball players
Basketball players from Philadelphia
Chicago Bulls draft picks
Chicago Bulls players
Indiana Pacers players
Junior college men's basketball players in the United States
Los Angeles Lakers draft picks
Los Angeles Stars draft picks
Memphis Tams players
New York Nets players
Small forwards
Temple Owls men's basketball players